Jeanne Ellen Collier (born May 15, 1946) is a former American diver. She competed at the 1964 Summer Olympics in Tokyo and won a silver medal in the 3 meter springboard. Collier graduated from the Xavier High School (Arizona) in Phoenix and won the 1963 AAU Championships on the springboard. She married Ken Sitzberger, who won the men's springboard event at the 1964 Olympics.

References

External links
 Jeanne Collier biography and Olympic results. sports-reference.com

1946 births
Living people
Divers at the 1964 Summer Olympics
Olympic silver medalists for the United States in diving
Sportspeople from Indianapolis
American female divers
Medalists at the 1964 Summer Olympics
21st-century American women